Tadmore is a hamlet within the Rural Municipality of Buchanan No. 304, Saskatchewan, Canada.

The community is likely named for ancient Palmyra in Syria, whose local name is Tadmor (Arabic: Tadmur).

Demographics 

See also
 List of communities in Saskatchewan
 List of hamlets in Saskatchewan

References

Buchanan No. 304, Saskatchewan
Designated places in Saskatchewan
Organized hamlets in Saskatchewan
Division No. 9, Saskatchewan